Juan F. Acosta (May 27, 1890 – 1968) was a Puerto Rican composer and music teacher.

Early years
Acosta, who came from a numerous family, was born and educated in the town of  San Sebastián, Puerto Rico located on the western part of Puerto Rico. His parents, realized that their son was gifted with musical talent, enrolled him at a young age to take  music classes.  He was under the tutorship of Jesus Fiqueroa (1878–1971), an accomplished composer himself, who taught him how to play various musical instruments, among them the clarinet and the euphonium.  By 1900, when Acosta was only 10 years old, he was able to prepare the musical arrangements for the orchestras directed by Fiqueroa.  In 1906, when he was 16 years old, Acosta was approached by the director of the San Sebastian Municipal Band, Ángel Mislan (1862–1911) who took him under his wing.  Mislan taught Acosta the art of musical composition and harmony.  Every town had a Band which played in the town's square.  The position of Band director was considered a very important one and when Mislan left San Sebastian, he recommended that Acosta be his successor.

First composition

Acosta had a girlfriend called Carmela who in turn had another friend by the same name.  Before moving from San Sebastian, in 1909, at the age of 19, he wrote his first danza titled Las Carmelas, inspired by the girls.  He moved to the town of Adjuntas where he organized its municipal band and various school bands.  It is also where he met his future wife, Ramonita Nieves.

Acosta's artistic talent was soon solicited in other parts of Puerto Rico and he found himself working and visiting other towns.  One of his students was a young man by the name of Rafael Alers, who in the future would also become a distinguished musician himself.  He visited over 37 towns, where he instructed teachers in music and helped develop the educational music system of their schools.

On July 7, 1936, Acosta was resting under a pine tree in the plaza of the town of Hatillo, which inspired him to write one of his greatest compositions, the danza Bajo La Sombra de un Pino (Under the Shade of a Pine). Among Acosta's many compositions are Asi es la Vida (That's Life); and "Glorias del Pasado" (Glories of the Past). Acosta wrote over 844 musical pieces, including 127 hymns.

Later years
Juan F. Acosta died in 1968 and is buried in Quebradillas.  According to his wishes, his family planted a pine tree by his grave. Over 300 of Acosta's musical compositions are safeguarded in the Institute of Puerto Rican Culture.  In the 1960s, the Institute made a recording of 12 of Acosta's greatest compositions, interpreted in piano by Elsa Rivera Salgado (1908–1998).

See also

List of Puerto Ricans

References

1890 births
1968 deaths
20th-century American composers
People from San Sebastián, Puerto Rico
Puerto Rican composers
Puerto Rican male composers
20th-century Puerto Rican musicians
20th-century American male musicians